"Frank" Yu Siu Fung (born 25 May 1963) is a Hong Kong racing driver currently competing in the GT Asia Series. He is a former TCR International Series driver, who made his debut in 2015.

Racing career
Yu began his career in 2008 in the Asia GT Championship. In 2010 he switched to the Clio Cup China Series. In 2010 Yu made his GT Asia Series debut, ending 3rd in the championship standings that year.

In March 2015 it was announced that he would race in the first ever TCR International Series round in Sepang, driving for Craft-Bamboo Racing.

Racing record

Complete TCR International Series results
(key) (Races in bold indicate pole position) (Races in italics indicate fastest lap)

Complete TCR Asia Series results
(key) (Races in bold indicate pole position) (Races in italics indicate fastest lap)

* Season still in progress.

References

External links
 

1963 births
Living people
TCR International Series drivers
Asian Le Mans Series drivers
TCR Asia Series drivers
Hong Kong racing drivers
24H Series drivers
United Autosports drivers
Craft-Bamboo Racing drivers